Times Square Mural is a mural by Roy Lichtenstein, fabricated in 1994 and installed in 2002 in Manhattan, New York City, United States. The work was commissioned by the Metropolitan Transportation Authority's Arts for Transit program.

See also
 1994 in art

References

External links
 Lichtenstein Foundation website

1994 works
Murals in New York City
Paintings by Roy Lichtenstein
Public art in New York City
Times Square
Trains in art